Mantar (Turkish) is the Turkish word for mushroom.

Mantar (Punjabi ਮੰਤਰ) is the Punjabi spelling of mantra and the English term for a mantra in Sikhism.

Mul Mantar (original mantra), first composition in the Sikh holy text 
Mantar (band)

See also
Jantar Mantar (disambiguation)